Terrence Paul "Terry" Bross (born March 30, 1966) is a former Major League Baseball pitcher. He bats and throws right-handed.

Bross attended St. John's University. A two-sport star, Bross also started at center for the school's basketball team. He helped St. John's to a Big East championship and a Final Four appearance.  On the baseball field, Bross anchored the team's pitching staff and helped lead his team to another Big East championship on the diamond.

Bross was drafted by the New York Mets in the 13th round of the 1987 amateur draft. He was signed June 10, 1987. He moved quickly through the Mets system, setting a saves record at AA Jackson. His final career numbers include a 0–0 record in 10 games and a 3.00 career ERA.

Bross would later go on to play in Nippon Professional Baseball for the Yakult Swallows and the Seibu Lions from 1995 to 1999. Bross led the Central League in earned run average in 1995, with a 2.33 ERA. He threw a no-hitter for the Swallows in September 1995.

References

External links

1966 births
Living people
Major League Baseball pitchers
Baseball players from Texas
New York Mets players
San Francisco Giants players
Yakult Swallows players
Seibu Lions players
Indianapolis Indians players
American expatriate baseball players in Japan
St. John's Red Storm baseball players
St. John's Red Storm men's basketball players
Sportspeople from El Paso, Texas
American men's basketball players
Jackson Mets players
Las Vegas Stars (baseball) players
Little Falls Mets players
Phoenix Firebirds players
Tidewater Tides players
Tucson Sidewinders players
Williamsport Bills players
St. Lucie Mets players